Artel Staratelei "Amur" Airlines was a charter passenger airline based in Khabarovsk, Russia; it was owned by Artel-Amur.

Fleet

Incidents

27 June 2010 - Northern Khabarovsk Krai - Mil Mi-8T crash-landed due to the failure of the tail rotor. The onboard mechanic received minor injuries, other crew members and passengers were not injured.

References

Defunct airlines of Russia
Companies based in Khabarovsk Krai